The 1968 South Dakota gubernatorial election was held on November 5, 1968.

Incumbent Republican Governor Nils Boe did not stand for re-election.

Republican nominee Frank Farrar defeated Democratic nominee Robert Chamberlin with 57.65% of the vote.

Primary elections
Primary elections were held on June 4, 1968.

Democratic primary

Candidates
Robert Chamberlin, former State Representative and Democratic candidate for Governor in 1966

Results

Republican primary

Candidates
Frank Farrar, Attorney General of South Dakota

Results

General election

Candidates
Robert Chamberlin, Democratic
Frank Farrar, Republican

Results

References

Bibliography
 
 

1968
South Dakota
Gubernatorial
November 1968 events in the United States